The Deori people , are one of the major Tibeto-Burmese ethnic group of the Northeast Indian states of Assam and Arunachal Pradesh. They refer to themselves as "Jimochayan" which means children's of Sun in their native language. They historically lived in the area of Sadiya, Joidaam, Patkai foothills and in the upper plains or also called as the hinterland of the Brahmaputra Valley. Scanty information was found in few books and official records. The Deori language belongs to the Boro-Garo branch of the Tibeto-Burman language family. The community has maintained their racial traits, language, religion, folktales and traditional beliefs through the centuries. They were divided into Dibang-Diyongial(Dibongia), Midoyan/Tengapania, Luitugan/Borgoya,Patorgoya. The native language is retained only by the Dibongia group.They call themselves Jimochanaya

History

Home Land

The homeland of the Deoris was in the eastern regions of undivided Assam. As per the folklore of the Deori people, they are settlers of the area of Joidaam and Patkai foothills and upper valley of Brahmaputra. Recorded Data and songs from the people dates back them as an early settlers in Sadiya  where their oldest and most sacred temple is situated. During Burmese (Maan as called by Deoris) aggression (1817-1826) deoris lost a lot of lives. Many slaughtered and many taken as captive. Again the destructive earthquake of 1869 devastated the whole community. The uncertainty about future prevailed amongst those who floated down in the river using bamboo and banana plant made raft.  They migrated to different places alongside the rivers they floated down.  As they entered and landed in their new territory, they took the name of that particular river as their clan name. Deoris under the ruler of the new land had followed the law of the land. Those Deoris who migrated to places with less interest and influence of the outside rulers had followed their culture and traditions and continued their dialect.

Some experts, like Bishnu Prasad Rabha, claim that the Pator-goya clan assimilated with the Tiwa people in central Assam but there has been no scientific evidence to support the claim, which prompted a section of Deoris to begin a search. A preliminary investigation from 30 September to 5 October under the aegis of Jimachaya Giyan Aru Juktibadi Samaj has given a positive indication of the presence of Deori people in Kachin province and near Yangon in Myanmar. A team of researchers has decided to visit Myanmar in search of the lost clan. Most of the people of Dibongiya class can speak their own mother tongue along with Assamese, but the rest of the 3 other classes/clans ( except few elderly persons) only understand and speak Assamese as their mother tongue. The three classes of Deoris live in the districts mentioned above.

Language
The Deori language is one of the languages of the Sino-Tibetan language family. Deori language is mainly spoken in Assam and Arunachal Pradesh. Over the years, Deori speakers, barring the Dibongia clan which uses it rigorously, have shifted to speaking the Assamese language, which can be attributed to the Language shift phenomenon.

Deori society

Deori clans
The Deori ethnic group are mainly divided into four clans, namely Dibongia, Borgoya, Tengaponiya and Pator-goya. The entire people of each main clan or main group are again subdivided into several sub-clans or sub-groups. The word "sub-clan" or "sub-group" is called "Boja" or "Bahor" in Deori language. Some of the commonly known sub-clan are like Ariya, Kumotaya, Bihiya, Naroda, Sundhariya, Patriya, Dupiya, Marangya, Chariya, Lagasuya, Chitigaya, Mehedaya, Kuliya, Khutiya/Buruk, Machiya, Bikomiya, Phaporiya, Fagimegia, Senaboriya, Chakucharu, Ekacharul/Busaru, Simocharu, Hizaru, Popharu, Gucharu etc. Each Deori people wants to know or wants to inform about their main clan and sub-clan (sub-group) in their first introduction. Otherwise, their introduction remains incomplete.

Notes

Tribes of Arunachal Pradesh
Tribes of Assam
Ethnic groups in Northeast India
Ethnic groups in South Asia